Jean-Luc Crétier (born April 28, 1966 in Albertville, Savoie) is a retired French World Cup alpine ski racer.  He was one of the four members of the "Top Guns" team, created and trained by Serge Guillaume outwith the mainstream of the French Alpine Ski Federation, along with Luc Alphand, Franck Piccard, and Denis Rey.

At age 31, Crétier won the gold medal in the downhill at the 1998 Winter Olympics in Nagano. He was the fourth Frenchman to win the Olympic downhill, but the first in thirty years, since Jean-Claude Killy in 1968. 

It was the only victory of Crétier's international career; however, he achieved five World Cup podium finishes, three in the two months prior to his Olympic title.

Crétier finished fourth in the combined event at the 1992 Winter Olympics in his hometown of Albertville. His final World Cup race was just ten months after Nagano; he incurred a career-ending knee injury at Val Gardena in December 1998.

World Cup results

Season standings

Race podiums
 0 wins 
 5 podiums - (5 DH), 25 top tens

World Championship results

 The Super-G in 1993 was cancelled after multiple weather delays.

Olympic results

References

External links

Jean-Luc Crétier World Cup standings at the International Ski Federation

1966 births
Living people
Sportspeople from Albertville
French male alpine skiers
Olympic alpine skiers of France
Olympic gold medalists for France
Alpine skiers at the 1988 Winter Olympics
Alpine skiers at the 1992 Winter Olympics
Alpine skiers at the 1994 Winter Olympics
Alpine skiers at the 1998 Winter Olympics
Olympic medalists in alpine skiing
Medalists at the 1998 Winter Olympics